Orlando Martins  (8 December 1899 – 25 September 1985) was a pioneering Yoruba Nigerian film and stage actor. In the late 1940s, he was one of Britain's most prominent and leading black actors, and in a poll conducted in 1947, he was listed among Britain's top 15 favourite actors.

Life
He was born as Emmanuel Alhandu Martins at Okesuna Street, Lagos, Nigeria, to a civil servant father with roots in Brazil and a Nigerian mother. Martins was related to the Benjamin Epega family. In 1913, he was enrolled in Eko Boys High School but dropped out.

During World War I, he served as a stoker on the RMS Mauretania to avenge German cruelty to his family. Following the end of the war, he moved to London; on arrival in 1919, he had no source of income and had to look for ways to earn money. Around the same time, the Lyceum Theatre was looking for "supers" at the rate of three shillings per day. Martins joined the theatre and from there took on various theatre jobs to survive. In 1923, Sanger's Circus wanted to have someone to display pythons, Martins took the part, starting his performing career in the circus. He also worked as a wrestler (known as "Black Butcher Johnson").

Career
In 1920, Martins was an extra acting with the Diaghilev ballet company, and was on the tour with the British company of Show Boat as a professional singer. He was an extra in silent films, having made his debut in If Youth But Knew (1926).
In the 1930s he went into acting on the London stage, playing Boukman in Toussaint Louverture: The Story of the Only Successful Slave Revolt in History, a 1936 drama by C. L. R. James that starred African-American actor Paul Robeson, with whom Martins had featured in the 1935 film Sanders of the River.

After the war, Martins had film roles in The Man from Morocco (1945) and in Men of Two Worlds (1946), alongside Robert Adams, becoming a sought-after character actor who was described by Peter Noble in 1948 as "a tall, powerful figure of a man with a deep bass voice, friendly, hospitable and with a grand sense of humour." Noble went on to say of Martins: "He is keenly interested in the foundation of a Negro Theatre in London. As he points out: 'If this ever comes into being it will mean not only that Negro talent in every theatre can be shown to the world, but a continuity of employment for this talent which is now going sadly to waste.

He appears in the 1949 film The Hasty Heart (starring Ronald Reagan and Patricia Neal), playing the African warrior Blossom, which role Martins also undertook in the stage production. In the 1950s he made other appearances on the London stage, including in adaptations of Cry, the Beloved Country (Trafalgar Square Theatre, 1954), and The Member of the Wedding (Royal Court Theatre, 1957), before returning to Lagos in 1959. He subsequently took roles in such films as Killers of Kilimanjaro (1960), Call Me Bwana (1963), Mister Moses (1965), and Kongi's Harvest (1970, Wole Soyinka's adaptation of his play of the same name).

Death and legacy 
Martins died in 1985 at the age of 85 in Lagos, where he was buried at Ikoyi Cemetery.

He is the subject of a 1983 book by Takiu Folami, entitled Orlando Martins, the Legend: an intimate biography of the first world acclaimed African film actor.

Bristol-based playwright Ros Martin has been researching and developing material in connection with Martins, her great-uncle.

Filmography

References

Further reading
 Takiu Folami, Orlando Martins, the Legend: an intimate biography of the first world acclaimed African film actor, Lagos, Nigeria: Executive Publishers, 1983, .

External links

Preview of relevant chapter in Stephen Bourne's book  Black in the British Frame
 "Orlando Martins", DAWN Commission.
 "Orlando Martins, The Legend – First World Acclaimed African Film Actor", Orlando Martins blog.
 "Celebrating Orlando Martins: First African Hollywood Star from Lagos", 20 April 2017.
 "Africa’s first Hollywood Star : Dr. Fykaa Caan speaks to Jay Jay Epega", Hollywood London Magazine, 28 June 2020.

1899 births
1985 deaths
20th-century British male actors
20th-century Nigerian male actors
Black British history
Black British male actors
British actors of Latin American descent
British people of Brazilian descent
British people of Nigerian descent
British people of Yoruba descent
Burials at Ikoyi Cemetery
Eko Boys' High School alumni
Male actors from Lagos
Nigerian expatriates in the United Kingdom
Nigerian male film actors
Nigerian male stage actors
Nigerian people of Brazilian descent
Nigerian people of World War I
Yoruba male actors